Tryokhgolovy Golets is the highest peak in the Primorsky Range, Irkutsk Oblast, Russia.

Geography

The peak is located in  near Lake Baikal, to the west of the western shore of the lake. It rises above Maloye Morye, opposite Olkhon Island

See also
List of mountains and hills of Russia

References

Mountains of Irkutsk Oblast
South Siberian Mountains
ru:Трёхголовый Голец